Mark Benjamin Sebastiaan Jonkman (born 20 March 1986) is a former Dutch cricketer. He is a right-arm fast bowler who has modelled his action on Australian fast bowler Brett Lee.

His identical twin, Maurits, made his debut for Netherlands in 2007.

External links 
 

1986 births
Living people
Dutch cricketers
Netherlands One Day International cricketers
Netherlands Twenty20 International cricketers
Sportspeople from The Hague
Dutch twins
Twin sportspeople
Identical twins